Saint-Germain-Lembron is a commune in the Puy-de-Dôme department in the Auvergne-Rhône-Alpes region in central France.

Geography
The village of Saint-Germain-Lembron is located in an alluvial basin crossed by a small stream : the Lembronnais.  That's what it Lembron from the suffix added to the name of Saint-Germain.

The heart of the village is situated off the highway A75 near the river Couze Ardes which flows into the Allier some two kilometers downstream on the territory of the neighboring town of Breuil-sur-Couze.

History
The history of Saint-Germain-Lembron dates back to Gallo-Roman times when a town designated as the Liziniat (Liziniacus) appearing in some ancient writings, the latter being located on-site or near the present village.  One of three churches dedicated to St. Germain was built here and, the town was home to a community of canons from the second half of the 10th century , finally gave its name to the town, as already attested to the Merovingian vicus.

From the 14th century , Saint-Germain-Lembron ranks among the thirteen good towns of Lower Auvergne.

During the revolutionary period of the National Convention (1792-1795), the town took the name of Liziniac-Lembron.

Politics
 March 2001   March 2008   Anne-Marie Stebernjak      
 March 2008   March 2014   René Roux       
 March 2014   In progress  Graziella Brunetti  LG left Party

Population

In 2017, the municipality had 1,980 inhabitants.

See also
 Communes of the Puy-de-Dôme department

References

Saintgermainlembron